Evrovidenie. Nacionalny Otbor (in Russian: Евровидение. Национальный отбор, IPA: [jɪvrɐˈvʲidʲɪnʲɪjɪ. nət͡sɨɐˈnalʲnɨj ɐˈdbor], lit. 'Eurovision. National Selection'), Nacionalny Otbor na Evrovidenie (in Russian: Национальный отбор на Евровидение, IPA: [nət͡sɨɐˈnalʲnɨj ɐˈdbor nə jɪvrɐˈvʲidʲɪnʲɪjɪ], lit. 'National Selection for Eurovision') or simply Evrovidenie (in Russian: Евровидение, IPA: [jɪvrɐˈvʲidʲɪnʲɪjɪ], lit. 'Eurovision') was a Russian televised musical competition organized by Russian public broadcasters Channel One (previously ORT) in odd years and Russia-1 (RTR) of VGTRK in even years. The competition is used to select  in the Eurovision Song Contest. Since 2005, it has been streamed live online through the respective websites of the broadcasters.

The competition has produced one winner, one runner-up and two top 10 placings for Russia in the contest. The results of the other selected representatives have ranged from 11th place in both 2009 and 2010 to a record low of 27th place in the 1996 qualifying round. At its inception, the winner of Evrovidenie was chosen by panels of jurors, but this changed to a public televoting system for the 2005 edition. In , the contest returned to choosing a winner by public televoting only.

History

Early years

To select its debut entry for the Eurovision Song Contest 1994, Russian broadcaster RTR hosted a national final on 12 March 1994 at the Shabolovka Studios in Moscow during the television programme Programma A. National final was hosted by Vadim Dolgachev. Prior to the event, RTR opened a submissions window for Russian citizens to submit their original songs for consideration. By the close of the submissions window, more than 30 songs had been submitted; eleven candidate entries were then selected by a jury panel from the received submissions. Two songs were later disqualified prior to the competition: "Oi oi oi" performed by Alena Apina was disqualified after being performed on Russian TV channel 2x2 prior to the competition and "" performed by Vika Tsiganova, which was withdrawn by Tsiganova after she wanted to change her contest song, which was not allowed by the rules. Nine remaining entries competed with the winning song chosen by a 17-member jury panel. At the close of voting, "Vechny strannik" performed by Youddiph received the most votes and was selected as the Russian entry. At the Eurovision Song Contest 1994, Russia finished ninth with 70 points.

For Russia's second participation in the contest, ORT organised a public selection process to select Russian entrant. The competition was held on 19 March 1995 at the Cosmos Hotel in Moscow and was later aired on 30 April 1995 on ORT. Eight songs competed and the winner was selected by the votes of an expert jury panel. At the conclusion of the voting, Oksana Pavlovskaya and Viktoria Vita tied for the first place. In the end, jury came to the conclusion that none of the participants deserves to represent Russia and therefore final ended without a winner. The broadcaster later opted to select their 1995 entry internally, since the jury was unable to select a winner.

In 1996, the right to choose Russia's entrant returned to RTR, which decided to organize the national final to select Russia's representative. The event took place on 2 March 1996 and was hosted by Youddiph, winner of 1994 edition. Fourteen songs took part in the contest. A jury, which was composed of representatives of RTR, music industry professionals and representatives of the public, selected Andrey Kosinsky as winner with the song "". Kosinsky was subsequently eliminated in the qualifying round for the Eurovision Song Contest 1996, which was used by the European Broadcasting Union in order to reduce the number of participating nations that would compete in the televised Eurovision final. After the non-qualification, RTR decided not to participate in the Eurovision Song Contest, leaving ORT (Channel One) as the only remaining broadcaster willing to take part in future years. The nation was then relegated from the 1998 and 1999 contests, before becoming able to return for 2000. For that contest, ORT opened the application window for a national final to take place on 19 February 2000 in Moscow, returning to the format of a national selection for the first time since 1996. However, financial problems at ORT forced them to cancel the event and instead select the Russian entry internally. In the following years, ORT opted to not hold national selections, switching instead to internally selected entrants.

2004–2011
In 2004, Yuri Aksyuta, Head of the Directorate of Music and Entertainment Broadcasting of Channel One, commented on the lack of national selection stating that "It's too early to trust our public". After the Russian discontent with the candidacy of the internally selected Yulia Savicheva in 2004, Channel One decided to change the format of the selection of contestants by holding a national final in 2005 for the first time since 1996. The national final consisted of three semi-finals, with ten songs in both the first and second semi-finals and nine in third; the third semi-final was initially to consist of ten songs as well, but Sergey Mazaev was late for the event and his song was disqualified. Three artists from each semi-final, chosen by televoting, qualified for the final which took place on 25 February. All shows took place in Ostankino Studios in Moscow and broadcast live three times, once in each of the three Russian time zones. All regions participated using televoting and SMS, with the results announced during the final broadcast for Western Russia. The winner of the national final was Natalia Podolskaya with the song "Nobody Hurt No One", receiving 20.2% of the votes. Natalia's victory created a scandal because many people were unable to cast their votes for other contestants, raising doubts about the fairness of the process. According to the company Edmar+, which organised the televoting, the capacity of their lines was limited, and when the mass of connections reached a critical volume, some calls and messages were automatically filtered out. At the Eurovision final, Russia took 15th place out of 24 with 57 points. Among their points was the maximum score of 12 from Belarus, the home country of Podolskaya. Following this result, Channel One decided to return to a internal selection the following year.

In 2008, the selection of Russia's Eurovision entrant returned to RTR, with the broadcaster organising a national selection with twenty-five candidates. Later, this number was increased to 27 after RTR added two participants: Sergey Lazarev and 2006 Belarusian Eurovision entrant Polina Smolova. Other participants included the 2006 Russian Eurovision entrant Dima Bilan, who submitted the song "". The song was disqualified when it was discovered that the song was released in 2006 by Argentinian singer Luciano Pereira, violating the Eurovision rule that barred songs from being commercially released before 1 October 2007. The song was replaced with "Believe", which won the event with 54 points, including the maximum score (27) from both the jury and televoting. Russia won that year's Eurovision Song Contest with 272 points.

After this victory, Channel One announced a national selection in November 2008 and opened a submission period for interested artists and composers to submit their entries. The initial format of the national final consisted of three stages: The first stage was for selecting the song, the second for selecting three artists, and the third for selecting the combination of song and artist. This format was later amended by Channel One, where the artists would instead compete with the songs they had entered with. The broadcaster received over a thousand submissions at the conclusion of the deadline. Fifty of them were shortlisted and a jury panel selected fifteen finalists for the national final. On 5 March 2009, Channel One announced that Anastasia Prikhodko would also participate in the national final with the song "", increasing the number of participants to sixteen. The national selection took place on 7 March at Ostankino Studios in Moscow and consisted of two stages. According to the results of the televoting, three superfinalists were selected from sixteen contestants: Anastasia Prikhodko, Valeriya, and the band Kvatro. Out of three applicants, a professional jury selected Anastasia Prikhodko's song "Mamo" as the winner. At the Eurovision Song Contest 2009, the song placed 11th with 91 points.

On 9 December 2009, RTR announced a submission period for artists to apply for the Eurovision Song Contest 2010. The broadcaster received over a thousand submissions at the conclusion of the deadline. Thirty-five entries were selected from the received submissions to proceed to auditions held on 1 March 2010 at the Vladimir Nazarov's Theater in Moscow. There, a jury panel selected the twenty-five finalists for the national final. The competing acts were announced on 2 March 2010. Ultimately, at the selection which took place on 7 March in Vladimir Nazarov's Theater in Moscow, the musical group of Peter Nalitch won with the song "Lost and Forgotten". For Eurovision, the band was renamed "Peter Nalitch and Friends". Their final placing in the Eurovision Song Contest 2010 held in Oslo was 11th, tying that of Anastasia Prikhodko the previous year. In 2011, Channel One canceled the national selection because of declining interest and the channel's claims that internally selected applicants placed higher than ones selected through the national selection process.

2012–2021

After one year of absence, RTR announced on 28 December 2011 that it would reinstate the national selection process, and asked for submissions from artists and composers. The broadcaster received 150 submissions at the conclusion of the deadline, and between thirty-five and forty entries were selected to proceed to auditions. There, a jury panel selected the twenty-five finalists for the national final, which was supposed to take place on 26 February, but was postponed to 7 March. Ultimately, at the selection held in the Akademichesky Concert Hall in Moscow, the winner was the band Buranovskiye Babushki with the song "Party for Everybody", which received 38.51 points. Runner-ups Dima Bilan and Julia Volkova scored 29.25, and third place Timati and Aida Garifullina scored 26.74. The song finished second at the Eurovision Song Contest 2012 with 259 points.

Following the 2012 selection, no Russian national selection was held for eight years. In 2014, a national selection was planned to take place, but was ultimately canceled because the broadcaster thought the song submissions were of poor quality. After the cancellation of the 2014 selection, both RTR and Channel One switched to internal selections. In 2020, Channel One internally selected the band Little Big with the song "Uno" to represent Russia at Eurovision Song Contest 2020. However, the band was unable to submit a suitable song, so Channel One decided to hold a national selection for the first time since 2012.

The selection committee at Channel One created shortlist of several candidates, from which three performers were selected for national final: Therr Maitz, #2Mashi and Manizha. The artists selected to participate were announced in the evening of the contest on 8 March and the names of participants were leaked via Instagram two hours before the contest began.  The contest took place on 8 March in Mosfilm Studios in Moscow and was won by Manizha with her song "Russian Woman". The song caused controversy as many Russian viewers took offense to a singer of Tajik descent singing about Russian women and the singer's activism for LGBT and women's rights; they demanded that she drop out of Eurovision. Several Russian politicians, such as Vladimir Zhirinovsky, Vitaly Milonov, Valentina Matvienko, Pavel Rudchenko and Yelena Drapeko also criticized Manizha's song. Drapeko suggested banning Manizha from performing in Eurovision under the Russian flag, commenting also that Eurovision offered no cultural value and was too politicized and pro-LGBT. The entry still went on to represent the nation at the contest in Rotterdam, Netherlands, and in the final Manizha reached 9th place with 204 points, of which 104 points were from the juries and 100 were from televoting. Following the Eurovision final, on 26 May 2021, Wonderzine published an article that retold reports from other sources that the national selection was staged, and Manizha's victory was a foregone conclusion. According to the article, Manizha's relatives are connected with state corporations. The next day, Manizha stated that she would file a lawsuit against Wonderzine and author of the article Yulia Taratuta.

The following day, all EBU members from Russia, including RTR and Channel One, announced their withdrawal from the union, according to a statement released by Russian state media, marking the end of Russian participation in Eurovision for the foreseeable future.

Series overview 
Color key

At Eurovision

Venues and host(s)

Voting

Judges

Viewing figures

See also
Russia in the Eurovision Song Contest

Notes and references

Notes

References 

1994 Russian television series debuts
1990s Russian television series
2000s Russian television series
2010s Russian television series
2020s Russian television series
Eurovision Song Contest selection events
Music competitions in Russia
Singing competitions
Russian music television series
Russia in the Eurovision Song Contest
Channel One Russia original programming
Russia-1 original programming
Television series revived after cancellation